Eugene "Gene" Louw, (15 July 1931 – 12 October 2015), was a South African politician, member of the National Party, MP for Durbanville and Paarl, who was administrator for Cape Province (1979–1989),  Minister of Home Affairs (1989–1992), National Education (1989–1990), Public Works (1992–1993) and Defence (1992–1993) in the F.W. de Klerk government.

Louw retired from political life in 1994 to return to his work as a lawyer in Durbanville.

References

1931 births
2015 deaths
Afrikaner people
South African people of Dutch descent
National Party (South Africa) politicians
Defence ministers of South Africa
Ministers of Home Affairs of South Africa
Speakers of the House of Assembly (South Africa)
Education ministers of South Africa